Limenitis reducta, the southern white admiral, is a butterfly of the family Nymphalidae.

Subspecies
 Limenitis reducta reducta Staudinger, 1901
 Limenitis reducta herculeana Stichel, 1909

Distribution and habitat
This species can be found in central and southern Europe (northern Iberia, southern and eastern France, Italy, the Balkans, and the Alps), in Western Asia, in Syria, the Caucasus and Iran.

Description 
Limenitis reducta has a wingspan of 46–54 mm. The upperside of the wings is brown black with metallic blue shine, large transversal band of white markings and a submarginal line of small blue dots. The blue sheen varies with the angle of light. The ground colour of underside of the hindwings is red, with a silvery basal area, a row of white markings and a row of black spots. A few white cell spots are also present on the underside of the forewings. They are light green to dull green on the back, red brown on the underside. On the back there are numerous brown thorns.

This species is rather similar to Limenitis camilla, Neptis rivularis and Araschnia levana f. prorsa.

Biology
This species may have one or more generations, depending on the location. The butterfly flies from May to August depending on the location. Larvae feed on honeysuckle (Lonicera periclymenum, Lonicera etrusca, Lonicera implexa, Lonicera xylosteum, Lonicera alpigena, Lonicera nummulariifolia and Lonicera caprifolium). Adults usually feed on nectar of a wide range of herbaceous and arboreal flowers, but also visit fallen fruits, dung, aphid secretions and mineralised moisture from damp ground.

Bibliography
Boulard (Michel), 1988.- Note sur la pariade du Sylvain azuré (Lep. Nymphalidae). Alexanor, 15 (3), 1987 (1988): 156-158.
D.J. Carter & B. Hargreaves - Guide des chenilles d'Europe - Delachaux & Niestlé, 2012,
Josef Settele, Roland Steiner, Rolf Reinhardt, Reinart Feldmann: Schmetterlinge. Die Tagfalter Deutschlands., Eugen Ulmer KG, 2005, 
Tom Tolman, Richard Lewington - Guide des papillons d'Europe et d'Afrique du Nord, Delachaux & Niestlé, Paris 1997 -

References

External links
 Lepi Net - Les Carnets du Lépidoptériste Français
 Moths and Butterflies of Europe and North Africa by Paolo Mazzei, Daniel Morel, Raniero Panfili

Limenitis
Butterflies of Europe
Butterflies described in 1901